Gerhardus Jacobus Labuschagné (born 5 December 1995) is a South African rugby union player who plays for the Houston SaberCats in Major League Rugby (MLR). He previously played for Yamaha Júbilo in the Japanese Top League. He is a utility back that can play as a fullback, centre, wing or fly-half.

Rugby career

Youth rugby and Free State XV

Labuschagné was born in Springs and went to high school in nearby Brakpan. However, he was never selected to represent his local  team at any provincial schoolboy tournaments. After high school, he moved to Bloemfontein, where he was included in the  squad. In July 2014, a video went viral of Labuschagné successfully kicking a penalty from 80m out during a training session at the University of the Free State. He made nine starts in the 2014 Under-19 Provincial Championship, appearing in the right wing, fullback and outside centre position during the season and scoring six points with the boot during a season that saw his team finish in second position, before losing their semi-final match 22–29 to eventual champions, .

Labuschagné was included in the  squad that played in the 2015 Vodacom Cup competition. The first of those came against  during the regular season of the Under-21 Provincial Championship, as the team finished second on the log to qualify for the title play-offs.

Labuschagné was included in the  wider training group for the 2016 Super Rugby season, but made no appearances in that competition. Instead, he once again represented the Free State XV, this time in the 2016 Currie Cup qualification series that effectively replaced the Vodacom Cup. Labuschagné scored his first senior points in this match, kicking two conversions in a 22–18 victory. He was once again in action for the  team in the 2016 edition of the Under-21 Provincial Championship, playing in all six of their matches during the regular season. The team finished in fourth spot on the log to qualify for a semi-final, but Labuschagné did not feature in their 23–26 defeat to Western Province.

References

South African rugby union players
Living people
1995 births
People from Springs, Gauteng
Rugby union fly-halves
Rugby union centres
Rugby union wings
Rugby union fullbacks
Free State Cheetahs players
Sportspeople from Gauteng
Golden Lions players
Pumas (Currie Cup) players
Shizuoka Blue Revs players
Houston SaberCats players